Andrei Krylov (born March 3, 1959), is a guitarist and composer, who is best known for his fantasy and romantic music compositions for the classical guitar and lute.

Biography

Andrei Krylov was born in Leningrad, USSR. He began his study of the classical guitar in the early 1970s. In 1998, Krylov emigrated from Russia to Canada .
He studied the classical guitar, arrangement, and musical composition in Leningrad, Saint Petersburg.
Krylov worked as a guitarist for the Russian State concert company Lenconcert and the Old Petersburg music theater in the 1980s and 1990s, also he was a leading member of several rock bands in Leningrad, Saint Petersburg like "Island", "Fragment" and "Doctor Blues". He worked as a soloist classical guitarist and as an accompanist for some notable Russian singers like Taisia Kalinchenko, Galina Baranova, Marina Kapuro. He has given recitals in Russia, Ukraine, Estonia, USA and Canada. Krylov has recorded and performed for Russian, US and Canadian radio and television. Russian state TV5 from Leningrad made a musical film with his music. 
Since 1998 he lived in Ontario and Quebec and also spent a lot of time in United States and Mexico, and Portugal, Spain and other countries of Europe - playing concerts and composing music there.
He has composed some original new flamenco and new-age music for documentaries and films in Canada and USA.
The National Gallery of Canada has placed six documentaries by Art Today USA with Krylov's music (which highlight such artists as: Toller Cranston (Canada), Mario Cabrera (Mexico) and Lena Bartula (USA), living in the Mexican city of San Miguel de Allende) in its Media Library. He also composed and recorded guitar music for films in Europe, New Zealand, Australia and USA including music for film about Esteban Vicente for museums featuring his art in New York and Madrid. Krylov composed guitar music for the 2011 short film Katya by Mako Kamitsuna, featuring Tatar-Russian movie star Chulpan Khamatova and composed guitar music for the 2020 short film Dymov by Liene Greifane, featuring Russian movie star Elizaveta Boyarskaya. His music featured in film "Children of the Inquisition"
His songs were #1 in charts of the World genre of Brazil, Poland, Finland, Latvia 
Krylov has written several books of poems: Mirrors, Lake Monastery, Autumn.

See also 
List of ambient music artists

References

Classical Guitar Composers List (CGCL) Homepage
Article in "Russian Express", Toronto
 article about Andrei Krylov on Lute and Guitar in Russia
  article about Andrei Krylov on Russian website dedicated to Flamenco
  article about Andrei Krylov on Russian Singer Songwriter Guitarists Web portal

1959 births
Living people
Seven-string guitarists
Composers for the classical guitar
Russian classical guitarists
Russian male guitarists
New-age guitarists
Russian guitarists
Canadian male guitarists
21st-century Canadian guitarists
21st-century Canadian male musicians
Naturalized citizens of Canada
Ambient musicians
Ambient composers
Celtic fusion musicians
20th-century classical composers
21st-century classical composers
Composers for violin
Postmodern composers